Picea polita, synonym Picea torano, commonly known as the tigertail spruce, is a species of conifer in the genus Picea. It is native to Japan.

References

External links

 Conifers Around the World: Picea torano - Tigertail Spruce.

polita
Endemic flora of Japan
Vulnerable flora of Asia
Plants described in 1855